Walant is a village in Achham District in the Seti Zone of western Nepal. At the time of the 2001 Nepal census, the population was 3624, of which 20% was literate.

References

Populated places in Achham District
Village development committees in Achham District